Hercules: An Original Walt Disney Records Soundtrack is the soundtrack to the 1997 Disney animated feature film, Hercules. It consists of music written by composer Alan Menken and lyricist David Zippel, orchestrated by Daniel Troob and Michael Starobin, with vocals performed by Lillias White, LaChanze, Roz Ryan, Roger Bart, Danny DeVito, and Susan Egan among others. The album also includes the single version of "Go the Distance" by Michael Bolton.

Background
In 1994, David Zippel was attached to compose the lyrics for the songs for the film, teaming up with Alan Menken. Zippel had previously collaborated with Menken on the cabaret revue titled It's Better With a Band, and the musical Diamonds, directed by Harold Prince. Distinctively for the film, the idea to incorporate gospel music for the songs was suggested by co-screenwriter and co-director John Musker, although Menken preferred "something very classic and Greek—a Candide approach". Musker explained, "Gospel is a storytelling kind of music. It can be exhilarating, especially when it gets everybody on their feet. We were looking for a modern equivalent for the Greek references and this style of music seemed to be entertaining and a real departure at the same time." The Spice Girls were originally approached to portray the Muses following an invitation to sing one of the songs, but declined the offer due to scheduling conflicts.

For the single version of "Go the Distance", Michael Bolton was personally chosen by Menken to record the song, in which Columbia Records paid an undisclosed figure to Walt Disney Records for the rights to the soundtrack. For the Spanish version of the film, "Go the Distance" was redone by Ricky Martin and released as a single under the title "No Importa La Distancia" and was also very successful, both inside and outside the United States. In the Turkish version of the film, "Go the Distance" was sung by Tarkan, who also performed the vocals for the adult Hercules. "Go the Distance" was nominated for both the Academy Award for Best Original Song and the Golden Globe Award for Best Original Song, but ultimately lost both to Celine Dion's hit "My Heart Will Go On" from Titanic.

Belinda Carlisle recorded two versions of "I Won't Say (I'm in Love)" as well as a music video for promotional purposes. Though the English version eventually opted not to use it, several foreign dubs have it in place of the reprise of "A Star Is Born" in the ending credits. These dubs include, but are not limited to, the Swedish one, the Finnish one, the Icelandic one and the Russian one. The DVD release of the Swedish dub has replaced it with the reprise of "A Star Is Born".

Track listing

Charts and certifications

Album charts

Single charts

Album certifications

References

1997 soundtrack albums
1990s film soundtrack albums
Disney Renaissance soundtracks
Disney animation soundtracks
Hercules (franchise)
Albums produced by Alan Menken
Walt Disney Records soundtracks
Alan Menken soundtracks